Podberezhsky is a rural locality (a passing loop) in Vokhtozhskoye Rural Settlement, Gryazovetsky District, Vologda Oblast, Russia. The population was 4 as of 2002.

Geography 
Podberezhsky is located 68 km east of Gryazovets (the district's administrative centre) by road. Popovka is the nearest rural locality.

References 

Rural localities in Gryazovetsky District